The Nuffield Professorship of Clinical Medicine is a chair at the University of Oxford. Created by the endowment of William Morris, 1st Viscount Nuffield, it was established in 1937. The chair is associated with a fellowship of Magdalen College, Oxford.

List of Nuffield Professors of Clinical Medicine

 1937–1965: Leslie John Witts
 1965–1974: Paul Bruce Beeson
 1974–1992: Sir David Weatherall
 1992–2002: Sir John Bell
 2004–2016: Sir Peter Ratcliffe
 2019–present: Richard Cornall

References

Professorships at the University of Oxford
Professorships in medicine